2,7,4'-Trihydroxyisoflavanone 4'-O-methyltransferase (SAM:2,7,4'-trihydroxyisoflavanone 4'-O-methyltransferase, HI4'OMT, HMM1, MtIOMT5) is an enzyme with systematic name S-adenosyl-L-methionine:2,7,4'-trihydroxyisoflavanone 4'-O-methyltransferase . This enzyme catalyses the following chemical reaction

 S-adenosyl-L-methionine + 2,7,4'-trihydroxyisoflavanone  S-adenosyl-L-homocysteine + 2,7-dihydroxy-4'-methoxyisoflavanone

This enzyme specifically methylates 2,7,4'-trihydroxyisoflavanone on the 4'-position.

References

External links 
 

EC 2.1.1